Plant Cell Reports is a monthly peer-reviewed scientific journal. It was established in 1981 and is published by Springer Science+Business Media.

External links 
 

Chemistry journals
Springer Science+Business Media academic journals
English-language journals
Monthly journals
Publications established in 1981